The following outline is provided as an overview of and topical guide to Republika Srpska:

Republika Srpska – unitary democratic parliamentary entity of the Western Balkans state of Bosnia and Herzegovina. Entity's population of 1.3 million, consisting of a constituent peoples: Serbs, Bosniaks, and Croats. The Serbs are most populous, and the most common religious denomination is Serbian Orthodoxy.

General reference 

 Common English country name: Republika Srpska
 Official English country name: Republika Srpska
 Common endonym: Republika Srpska
 Official endonym: Republika Srpska
 Etymology: Name of Republika Srpska
 International rankings of Republika Srpska
 ISO country codes: BA-SRP
 ISO region codes: See ISO 3166-2:BA
 Internet country code top-level domain: .ba

Geography of Republika Srpska 

 Republika Srpska is: an entity of Bosnia and Herzegovina
 Location:
 Eastern Hemisphere
 Northern Hemisphere
 Eurasia
 Europe
 Southern Europe
 Balkans (also known as "Southeastern Europe")
 Time zone:  Central European Time (UTC+01), Central European Summer Time (UTC+02)
 Extreme points of Republika Srpska
 High:  Maglić 
 Land boundaries:  2,170 km
internal entity boundary
Federation of Bosnia and Herzegovina 1,150 km
as part of Bosnia and Herzegovina international border
 369 km
 357 km
 294 km
 Population of Republika Srpska: 1,326,991

 Area of Republika Srpska: 
 Atlas of Republika Srpska

Environment of Republika Srpska 

 Climate of Republika Srpska
 Renewable energy in Republika Srpska
 Geology of Republika Srpska
 Protected areas of Republika Srpska
 Biosphere reserves in Republika Srpska
 National parks of Republika Srpska
 Wildlife of Republika Srpska
 Fauna of Republika Srpska
 Birds of Republika Srpska
 Mammals of Republika Srpska

Natural geographic features of Republika Srpska 

 Lakes of Republika Srpska
 Mountains of Republika Srpska
 Rivers of Republika Srpska
 World Heritage Sites in Republika Srpska

Regions of Republika Srpska 

Regions of Republika Srpska
 Bosanska Krajina
 East Herzegovina
 Podrinje
 Posavina
 Romanija
 Usora

Administrative divisions of Republika Srpska 

Administrative divisions of Republika Srpska
 Municipalities of Republika Srpska
 Regions of Republika Srpska

Municipalities of Republika Srpska 

 Cities of Republika Srpska

Demography of Republika Srpska 

 Serbs of Bosnia and Herzegovina
Bosniaks of Bosnia and Herzegovina
Croats of Bosnia and Herzegovina

Government and politics of Republika Srpska 

 Form of government: parliamentary representative democratic republic
 Capital of Republika Srpska: Sarajevo
 Elections in Republika Srpska
 Republika Srpska general election, 2002
 Republika Srpska general election, 2006
 Republika Srpska presidential election, 2007
 Republika Srpska general election, 2010
 Republika Srpska general election, 2010
 Political parties in Republika Srpska

Branches of government

Executive branch of the government of Republika Srpska 

 Head of state: President of Republika Srpska, Milorad Dodik (2010-)
 Head of government: Prime Minister of Republika Srpska, Željka Cvijanović (2013-)
 Government of Republika Srpska

Legislative branch of the government of Republika Srpska 

 People's Assembly (unicameral)

Judicial branch of the government of Republika Srpska 

 Constitutional Court of Republika Srpska
 Supreme Court of Republika Srpska

Foreign relations of Republika Srpska 

 Diplomatic missions in Republika Srpska
 Diplomatic missions of Republika Srpska

International organization membership

Law and order in Republika Srpska 

Law of Republika Srpska
 Capital punishment in Republika Srpska
 Constitution of Republika Srpska
 Crime in Republika Srpska
 Human rights in Republika Srpska
 LGBT rights in Republika Srpska
 Freedom of religion in Republika Srpska
 Law enforcement in Republika Srpska

Local government in Republika Srpska

History of Republika Srpska 

 Military history of Republika Srpska

Culture of Republika Srpska 

 Architecture of Republika Srpska
 Cuisine of Republika Srpska
 Ethnic minorities in Republika Srpska
 Festivals in Republika Srpska
 Languages of Republika Srpska
 Media in Republika Srpska
 Museums in Republika Srpska
 National symbols of Republika Srpska
 Seal of Republika Srpska
 Flag of Republika Srpska
 National anthem of Republika Srpska
 People of Republika Srpska
 Prostitution in Republika Srpska
 Public holidays in Republika Srpska
 Records of Republika Srpska
 Religion in Republika Srpska
 Orthodoxy in Republika Srpska
 Islam in Republika Srpska
 Catholicism in Republika Srpska
 Judaism in Republika Srpska
 Buddhism in Republika Srpska
 World Heritage Sites in Republika Srpska

Art in Republika Srpska 

 Art of Republika Srpska
 Cinema of Republika Srpska
 Literature in Republika Srpska
 Music of Republika Srpska
 Television in Republika Srpska
 Theatre in Republika Srpska

Sports in Republika Srpska 

Sports in Republika Srpska
 Football in Republika Srpska
 Republika Srpska national football team

Economy and infrastructure of Republika Srpska 

 Agriculture in Republika Srpska
 Banking in Republika Srpska
 Banks in Republika Srpska
 Communications in Republika Srpska
 Internet in Republika Srpska
 Companies of Republika Srpska
 Energy in Republika Srpska
 Energy policy of Republika Srpska
 Oil industry in Republika Srpska
 Health care in Republika Srpska
 Mining in Republika Srpska
 Banja Luka Stock Exchange
 Tourism in Republika Srpska
 Transportation in Republika Srpska
 Airports in Republika Srpska
 Rail transport in Republika Srpska
 Roads in Republika Srpska
 Highways in Republika Srpska
 State routes in Republika Srpska

Education in Republika Srpska 

 List of schools in Republika Srpska
 List of high schools in Republika Srpska
 Institutions of higher education in Republika Srpska
 University of Banja Luka
 University of Istočno Sarajevo
 University of Bijeljina

See also 

Index of Republika Srpska-related articles
List of Republika Srpska-related topics
List of international rankings
Outline of Europe
Outline of geography

References

External links 
 

 
Republika Srpska